Emmanuel "Lolly" Vella (7 August 1933 – 29 September 2012) was an Australian former association footballer.

Club career
Vella played for Footscray JUST, Sunshine George Cross and Maribyrnong-Polonia in the Victoria State League.

International career
Vella played two matches for the Australia national team in 1958 against New Zealand.

Post-football
Vella worked for Massey Ferguson until retiring at the age of 57. He died in September 2012.

References

1933 births
2012 deaths
Australian soccer players
Australia international soccer players
Association footballers not categorized by position